The Loue is a 51 km long river in the Nouvelle-Aquitaine region of France. It is a tributary of the Isle, itself a tributary of the Dordogne.

The source of the river is in the commune of Saint-Yrieix-la-Perche in the Massif Central. It runs through the Haute-Vienne department, and empties into the Isle near Coulaures in the Dordogne department. Its main tributaries are the Haute Loue and the Ravillou.

Places
Haute-Vienne: Saint-Yrieix-la-Perche
Dordogne: Excideuil, Coulaures

Hydrology

The mean annual discharge, measured at Saint-Médard-d'Excideuil, is 2.91 m3/s. The highest flow was measured during a flash flood on September 22, 1993: 111 m3/s (daily average).

References

Rivers of France
Rivers of Nouvelle-Aquitaine
Rivers of Dordogne
Rivers of Haute-Vienne